St. Joseph's Catholic High School is a Catholic high school in Windsor, Ontario operated by the Windsor-Essex Catholic District School Board.  D. Labute is the current principal.
A new school  in size with space for more than 1,200 students has been built at the corner of McHugh and Clover Avenue, just north of Tecumseh Road East in Windsor. It opened in September 2006. This newer school has replaced the former one at 5420 Empress Street in Windsor.

The new school building includes a physical education workout facility, cafetorium, football field & track, atrium, and the St. Joseph's Chapel. St. Joseph's has a wide variety of sports also including football, soccer, baseball, volleyball, basketball, badminton, curling, wrestling and golf.

St. Joseph's High School currently offers Specialist High Skills Major programs in four areas of study: Health and Wellness, Visual Arts & Media, Construction Technology and Business.  

Its family of elementary schools includes:

 St. Anne French Imm. CES
 L.A. Desmarais CES
 H.J. Lassaline CES
 St. John Vianney CES

See also
List of high schools in Ontario

External links
St. Joseph's Catholic High School at Windsor-Essex Catholic District School Board
http://www.stjosephshighschool.com/

Windsor-Essex Catholic District School Board
High schools in Windsor, Ontario
Catholic secondary schools in Ontario
Educational institutions established in 1989
1989 establishments in Ontario